Michael Osskopp (born October 3, 1951) is an American politician in the state of Minnesota. He served in the Minnesota House of Representatives.

References

Republican Party members of the Minnesota House of Representatives
1951 births
Living people